It's a Cop is a 1934 British police-themed comedy film directed by Maclean Rogers and starring Sydney Howard, Chili Bouchier and Garry Marsh. It was made at British and Dominion Elstree Studios.

Plot
An incompetent police constable gets a lucky break and catches some thieves, earning his promotion to sergeant.

Cast
 Sydney Howard as PC Robert Spry
 Chili Bouchier as Babette
 Donald Calthrop as Charles Murray
 Garry Marsh as James Risden
 Annie Esmond as Mrs. Spry
 Cyril Smith as Lewis
 John Turnbull as Inspector Gray
 Ronald Simpson as Bates

References

Bibliography
 Low, Rachael. Filmmaking in 1930s Britain. George Allen & Unwin, 1985.
 Wood, Linda. British Films, 1927-1939. British Film Institute, 1986.

External links

1934 films
1934 comedy films
1930s police comedy films
Films directed by Maclean Rogers
British comedy films
Films set in England
British black-and-white films
British and Dominions Studios films
Films shot at Imperial Studios, Elstree
Films with screenplays by John Paddy Carstairs
1930s British films